Pedro Estácio Leão Piquet Souto Maior (born 3 July 1998) is a Brazilian former racing driver. He is the son of three-time Formula One world champion Nelson Piquet and younger half brother of Formula E champion Nelson Piquet Jr. He is known for his successes in single-seater junior categories, including winning the 2014 and 2015 Brazilian Formula 3 Championships.

Career

Karting
Piquet began his racing career in karts at age 8 in 2006. During his karting career, he won numerous titles, including three Brazilian championships.

Toyota Racing Series
Piquet debuted in single-seater cars in the 2014 Toyota Racing Series. He struggled in the first six races, finishing no higher than 13th. His season was then brought to a premature end by licensing problems relating to his age.

In 2016, he returned to the series, racing for M2 Competition for two seasons.

Brazilian Formula Three
Following his derailed first attempt at the Toyota Racing Series, Piquet returned to Brazil and began racing in Brazilian Formula Three in 2014. He had an extremely successful season, winning 11 of the 16 races and the championship. In 2015, he chose to continue racing in Brazilian Formula Three, winning it for the second time.

European Formula 3
In 2016, Piquet joined Van Amersfoort Racing for the European Formula 3 championship. He competed for two seasons.

GP3 Series
In 2018, Piquet joined Trident Racing and competed In the GP3 Series, winning in Silverstone and Monza. He finished the season in sixth place.

FIA Formula 3 Championship
For 2019, Piquet stayed in GP3, but the championship turned into the FIA Formula 3 Championship, remaining with Trident. He took 1 win at Spa and ended the championship in 5th, helping Trident to finish fourth in the team championship.

FIA Formula 2 Championship
in 2020, Piquet competed in F2 with Charouz alongside Louis Delétraz. He took his first points in the sprint race at Barcelona, Spain, finishing in 7th place. He left at the end of the season citing financial reasons.

Other racing experience
Alongside his single-seater racing, Piquet has participated in other events. In 2014, he entered and won the Brazilian Porsche GT3 Cup Challenge. He also entered one race in the Global Rallycross Championship, taking a podium, and one race in the Brazilian Mercedes-Benz Challenge C250 Cup. In 2015, he started two races in the Porsche Mobil 1 Supercup, scoring no points. He also raced again in the Brazilian Porsche GT3 Cup Challenge, this time scoring two podiums in six races.
Pedro Piquet is competing in the ROK Shifter class in karting in 2023, he competes in the Florida Winter Tour, competing against the likes of Marijn Kremers and former GP3 driver Giorgio Carrara.

Racing record

Career summary

† As Piquet was a guest driver, he was ineligible to score points.

Complete Formula 3 Brasil results
(key) (Races in bold indicate pole position) (Races in italics indicate fastest lap)

Complete Porsche Supercup results
(key) (Races in bold indicate pole position) (Races in italics indicate fastest lap)

† As Piquet was a guest driver, he was ineligible to score points.

Complete FIA Formula 3 European Championship results
(key) (Races in bold indicate pole position) (Races in italics indicate fastest lap)

Complete Macau Grand Prix results

Complete GP3 Series results
(key) (Races in bold indicate pole position) (Races in italics indicate fastest lap)

Complete FIA Formula 3 Championship results
(key) (Races in bold indicate pole position; races in italics indicate points for the fastest lap of top ten finishers)

† Driver did not finish the race, but was classified as he completed over 90% of the race distance.

Complete FIA Formula 2 Championship results
(key) (Races in bold indicate pole position) (Races in italics indicate points for the fastest lap of top ten finishers)

† Driver did not finish the race, but were classified as they completed more than 90% of the race distance.

References

External links
 

1998 births
Living people
Brazilian people of French descent
Brazilian Formula Three Championship drivers
Toyota Racing Series drivers
Global RallyCross Championship drivers
Porsche Supercup drivers
FIA Formula 3 European Championship drivers
Brazilian GP3 Series drivers
FIA Formula 3 Championship drivers
Pedro Piquet
FIA Formula 2 Championship drivers
Trident Racing drivers
Sportspeople from Brasília
Stock Car Brasil drivers
Piquet GP drivers
M2 Competition drivers
Walter Lechner Racing drivers
Van Amersfoort Racing drivers
Charouz Racing System drivers